Clinical Psychology: Science and Practice is a quarterly peer-reviewed scientific journal covering clinical psychology. It was established in 1994 and is published by Wiley-Blackwell on behalf of the Society of Clinical Psychology, Division 12 of the American Psychological Association, of which it is the official journal. Beginning in 2021, it will be published by the Association's publishing arm, APA Publishing. The editor-in-chief is Arthur M. Nezu (Drexel University). According to the Journal Citation Reports, the journal has a 2018 impact factor of 6.028, ranking it 4th out of 130 journals in the category "Psychology, Clinical".

References

External links

Publications established in 1994
English-language journals
Wiley-Blackwell academic journals
Clinical psychology journals
Quarterly journals
Academic journals associated with learned and professional societies of the United States